"The Only Thing That Looks Good on Me Is You" is a song co-written and performed by Canadian singer-songwriter Bryan Adams. It was released in May 1996 as the lead single from Adams' seventh studio album, 18 til I Die (1996). The song peaked at number one in Canada, number six in the United Kingdom, and number 52 in the United States.

Adams was nominated for Grammy Award for Best Male Rock Vocal Performance but lost to Beck's "Where It's At". Adams was also nominated for "Juno Award for Best Producer" (also for "Let's Make a Night to Remember"). The song is included on the soundtrack of the film Excess Baggage (1997) and has appeared on Adams' compilation albums The Best of Me and Anthology.

Critical reception
Larry Flick from Billboard wrote, "Adams' single output has been so ballad-heavy in recent years that it is easy to forget that he is a diehard rocker at the core. This first peek into his forthcoming "18 'Til I Die" collection is a fun reminder of that fact, as Adams tears through a hearty spree of blues-tinged pop beats and jittery guitars with the glee of a hormone-crazed kid in his first band." Another editor, Paul Verna noted that "Adam excels" on "the straight-ahead rocker". Daina Darzin from Cash Box described it as "a happy, driving rocker with a big, catchy hook".

Music video
The accompanying music video for "The Only Thing That Looks Good on Me Is You" was directed by Matthew Rolston, who also directed "Let's Make a Night to Remember". The video was nominated for MTV Video Music Award for Best Male Video. In an interview with Songfacts, Adams stated that the clip is his own favorite video. It features various male and female models (including Ana Cristina Oliveira) walking and dancing up and down a catwalk wearing sexy and outrageous outfits. It also features Adams in a bathroom sitting on the toilet with his guitar and standing in front of the mirror trying to do his hair. A shot from recording sessions is used as the cover of Adams' 18 til I Die album cover. The music video is shown in the film Red Corner (1997) starring Richard Gere.

Track listings

 Canadian, US, and Australian CD single
 "The Only Thing That Looks Good on Me Is You" (single version) – 3:24
 "Hey Elvis" – 3:23
 "I Want It All" – 4:46
 "The Only Thing That Looks Good on Me Is You" – 3:40

 US 7-inch and cassette single
A. "The Only Thing That Looks Good on Me Is You" (single version) – 3:24
B. "Hey Elvis" – 3:23

 UK CD single
 "The Only Thing That Looks Good on Me Is You" (single version)
 "Summer of '69"
 "Cuts Like a Knife"
 "Thought I'd Died and Gone to Heaven"

Charts

Weekly charts

Year-end charts

Release history

References

Bryan Adams songs
1996 singles
1996 songs
A&M Records singles
RPM Top Singles number-one singles
Song recordings produced by Robert John "Mutt" Lange
Songs written by Bryan Adams
Songs written by Robert John "Mutt" Lange